Björn Karl Michael Wirdheim (born 4 April 1980) is a Swedish professional racing driver. He is the son of Örnulf Wirdheim, also a racing driver. Björn began racing karts, competing in his first race, at the age of 10. His main achievement to date is becoming the International Formula 3000 Champion in 2003.

Career
Born in Växjö, Wirdheim began racing karts at age ten, until the age of fifteen, winning the Southern Swedish Karting Championship. In 1996, he progressed to single-seaters in Swedish Formula Ford 1600 Junior Championship where he took the championship title in 1997 with 17 wins. In 1998 and 1999 he raced in the Formula Palmer Audi Championship, achieving two podium finishes.

International Formula 3000

In 2000, he switched to the German Formula Three Championship. Then, during 2001 in addition to winning at Nürburgring and A1-Ring, he took three pole positions including one at Macau Grand Prix. For the season of 2002 Wirdheim switched, this time to International Formula 3000, joining Arden International. He finished fourth overall, in addition to being named Rookie of the Year, and helping Arden to win the team title in the championship.

Wirdheim stayed with Arden in the following season of 2003 that would prove successful both for the team and driver. He dominated the championship so much that an obligatory pit stop for tire change was introduced at the end of the season in an attempt to level the advantage, but Arden managed to do better pit-stops overall than other teams and still came out on top. Wirdheim became the first Swede to win the championship in its 19-year history, breaking Justin Wilson's previous record of most points won in one season of the series. However, at Monaco, when driving to an easy win on the streets of Monte Carlo, Wirdheim slowed down to wave at his pit-crew believing he already had taken the chequered flag and was overtaken by Nicolas Kiesa, metres away from the actual finish line.

At the end of 2003, Wirdheim had been noticed by several Formula One team bosses, giving him opportunity to test with both Jordan and BAR. After turning down an offer to drive Champ Car, Wirdheim signed with Jaguar as third driver performing the Friday testing for the team at Formula One Grand Prix weekends during the 2004 season.

Champ Car
For the 2005 season, Wirdheim turned to the Champ Car World Series to join the HVM racing team. Run by former Pacific F1 team boss Keith Wiggins, the team was underfunded after losing its previous Herdez backing, and a lack of testing made it difficult for the team to be competitive. After mediocre results, Wirdheim and the team decided to part ways after 11 races into the season.

Recent career
Wirdheim has since competed in the Japanese Formula Nippon series. Driving for Team Dandelion, a team with two constructors' championships and one drivers' title, Wirdheim finished 6th in the 2006 championship, with one second place as best and continued with the team in 2007. He has raced in Super GT since 2006, finishing 2nd in the championship in 2013 and 2014. In 2016 he will dovetail his Super GT commitments with a drive for Flash Engineering in the Scandinavian Touring Car Championship.

While taking up a new challenge in 2018 as a Formula 1 TV-commentator for Viasat, Wirdheim has made guest appearances in Porsche Carrera Cup Scandinavia. In 2018 Wirdheim also won the 1966-1972 class of the Historic Grand Prix of Monaco in a March 711.

Racing record

Complete International Formula 3000 results
(key) (Races in bold indicate pole position; races in italics indicate fastest lap.)

Complete Formula One participations
(key)

* Was entered as Third Driver, but did not run due to bad weather.

Complete Champ Car results
(key)

Complete Formula Nippon results
(key) (Races in bold indicate pole position)

Complete Super GT results

Complete FIA World Endurance Championship results

Complete European Le Mans Series results

Complete Scandinavian Touring Car Championship results
(key) (Races in bold indicate pole position) (Races in italics indicate fastest lap)

References

External links

 Official Björn Wirdheim site
 Forix
 Wirdheim racing statistics

1980 births
Living people
Champ Car drivers
International Formula 3000 Champions
Formula Nippon drivers
German Formula Three Championship drivers
Super GT drivers
Swedish racing drivers
International Formula 3000 drivers
Formula Palmer Audi drivers
FIA World Endurance Championship drivers
European Le Mans Series drivers
Asian Le Mans Series drivers
Prema Powerteam drivers
Arden International drivers
HVM Racing drivers
People from Växjö
Sportspeople from Kronoberg County
Dandelion Racing drivers
Team LeMans drivers
Kondō Racing drivers
Greaves Motorsport drivers